The Dubingiai massacre was a mass murder of 20–27 Lithuanian civilians in the town of Dubingiai (Dubinki) on 23 June 1944. The massacre was carried out by the Polish Home Army's 5th Wilno Brigade, part of the Polish resistance, in reprisal for the Glinciszki (Glitiškės) massacre of Polish civilians committed by the Nazi-subordinated 258th Lithuanian Police Battalion on 20 June 1944. The Dubingiai massacre started a wider Polish Home Army (abbreviated as AK) operation in which units beyond the 5th Brigade were involved. In total, 70–100 Lithuanians were killed by the end of June 1944 in Dubingiai and the neighbouring villages of Joniškis, and Giedraičiai. While Nazi collaborators were ostensibly the prime targets, the victims also included the elderly, children, including infants of 4 and 11 months. Further conflicts between Lithuanian and Polish units were prevented by the Soviet capture of Vilnius in mid-July.

Background

The Lithuanian–Polish relations during the interbellum period were strained since both sides had laid claim to the Vilnius Region. During World War II, these tensions were exacerbated by different allegiances: Lithuanian administration and paramilitary units were leaning towards Nazi Germany while Polish resistance waged an active partisan war against the Nazis. Eventually, these tensions grew into a low-level civil war that culminated in a series of civilian massacres.

On 20 June 1944, members of the AK killed four members of the 258th Lithuanian Police Battalion in the village of Glitiškės (Glinciszki). In retaliation, the Lithuanian police killed 39 Polish villagers (the Glinciszki massacre). In light of these events as well as other information about intensified pacification actions by the Lithuanian forces, the AK command for the Vilnius Region, under Aleksander Krzyżanowski codename Wilk, assumed that it represented a beginning of a new, large anti-Polish operation and only a demonstration of the strength of Polish forces in the region could stop the killings and protect the Polish civilians. Leaflets were distributed through the region that AK was planning to execute members of the Lithuanian units guilty of the Glinciszki massacre, and a raid on the pre-war Lithuanian Republic territory was planned. The AK command did not plan, and actually strictly forbade, any reprisals against innocent civilians.

Murders in Dubingiai
The 5th Brigade of AK, under command of Zygmunt Szendzielarz codename Łupaszko, learned that some of the individuals responsible for the Glinciszki massacre and their families were stationed in the police station in Dubingai. A company of the 5th Brigade under  codename Rakoczy decided to destroy the police station and to execute several Nazi-Lithuanian informants. There are different versions as to who led the raid on Dubingiai; most sources attribute it to Szendzielarz, the commander of the 5th Brigade, while Henryk Piskunowicz, Polish historian and author of several publications about AK operations in Vilnius Region, specifically pointed to Wiącek. The AK headquarters learnt of that initiative and was afraid that the soldiers of the 5th Brigade who had freshly witnessed the aftermath of Glinciszki may not follow the orders forbidding actions against civilians. It sent a courier from the headquarters in Vilnius ordering the 5th Brigade to stay put, the courier, however, did not reach the local commanders in time.

The village was warned that the Polish attack was imminent and many individuals—including the policemen who participated in the Glinciszki massacre—escaped before the Poles began the killings. The AK targeted the Lithuanian populace, using Lithuanian prayer books as a means of identifying Lithuanians, but sparing those intermarried with Poles. While Nazi collaborators were ostensibly the prime targets, the victims included the elderly, children, and even infants. A Polish woman and her 4-year-old son were also reported to have been killed. The total number of victims is estimated between 20 and 27.

Further reprisals

The reprisal actions in Dubingiai, even if premature and unplanned by AK command, marked the beginning of a wider AK operation in which units beyond the 5th Brigade were involved. From 25 to 27 June, various Polish units entered pre-war Lithuanian territory and carried out a series of actions against Lithuanian Auxiliary Police Battalions and those labeled as Nazi sympathizers. Bridges and telecommunication lines were destroyed. Polish sources note that a number of civilian casualties occurred as a result of the wider operations during that period, particularly when several buildings caught fire. According to Lithuanian sources, in total, 70–100 Lithuanian civilians were killed by the end of June 1944 in Dubingiai and the neighbouring villages of Joniškis (12 people by a squadron commanded by AK member codename Maks), and Giedraičiai. The youngest victim was a 4-month-old baby.

Aftermath
Piskunowicz contends that AK's reprisals of 23–27 June were successful since there were no further actions by Lithuanian forces similar to the preceding Glinciszki massacre. This contention is, however, largely speculative as any potential for further escalation by either side was cut short by the Soviet occupation of Vilnius two weeks later. 

This chain of events stained the reputation of AK in Lithuania and continue to sour the Lithuanian–Polish relations. Zygmunt Szendzielarz, the commander of the 5th Brigade, which was responsible for the massacre, became a member of the Polish anti-Soviet resistance and was arrested in 1948 by the communist Polish secret police. After more than two years of torture and interrogation, he was executed by the communist Polish government in 1951. In 1993, after the fall of communism, Szendzielarz was rehabilitated and declared innocent of all charges by the Military Chamber of the Supreme Court. Szendzielarz continues to receive posthumous honors: order of Polonia Restituta from President Lech Kaczyński in 2007, promotion to Lieutenant General by Minister of Defense Antoni Macierewicz and a speech by President Andrzej Duda praising Szendzielarz and urging Polish youth to follow his example in 2016, each time causing negative press in Lithuania.

In 1992, Lithuanian authorities opened a criminal case regarding AK massacres in Molėtai district. The investigation recorded at least 273 Lithuanian deaths in 1943–45, but was unable to determine identities of the responsible AK members. Since AK commanders were already dead, the case was closed in 1996.

References

Bibliography

Secondary sources

Lithuanian

Polish

News sources

Lithuanian

Polish 

 
 
 

1944 in Lithuania
Generalbezirk Litauen
Lithuania–Poland relations
Massacres in Lithuania during World War II
Mass murder in 1944
Military operations involving the Home Army
Poland in World War II
June 1944 events